Zalmoxianism or Zamolxianism is a Neopagan movement in Romania which promotes the rebuilding of an ethnic religion and spirituality of the Romanians through a process of reconnection to their ancient Dacian and Thracian roots. The religion takes its name from Zalmoxis or Zamolxe, at the same time the name of the primordial god and the archetype of the enlightened man in Paleo-Balkan mythology. Scholars Bakó and Hubbes (2011) have defined Zalmoxianism, like the other ethnic religious revivals of Europe, as a reconstructionist ethno-paganism.

Origins
The reconstruction of ancient Dacian and Thracian religion and mythology has been strictly connected with the field of dacology. Amongst contemporary supporters of Zalmoxianism, the emigrant dacologist Octavian Sărbătoare even proposed to make it the official religion of Romania.

Organisations

The Gebeleizis Society
The "Gebeleizis Society" (Romanian: Societatea Gebeleizis), though far from being the only Zalmoxian group in Romania, has been the most studied formation. It has 500 members split into 15 branches. The core values of the organisation are expressed by its motto "One Family, One Nation, One Territory" (Romanian: O Familie, Un Neam, Un Teritoriu); for the ideas promoted, the Gebeleizis Society has been subject of media scandal, and accused of extremism.

Zamolxe group
Another group is the Zamolxe, based in Bucharest, whose high priest is Alexandru Mihail.

See also
 Hungarian Neopaganism
 Slavic Neopaganism
 Protochronism

References

Bibliography
 László-Attila Hubbes. Romanian Ethno-Paganism: Discourses of Nationalistic Religion in Virtual Space. In Native Faith and Neo-Pagan Movements in Central and Eastern Europe. Kaarina Aitamurto, Scott Simpson. Acumen Publishing, 2013. 
 Rozália Klára Bakó, László-Attila Hubbes. Religious Minorities' Web Rhetoric: Romanian and Hungarian Ethno-Pagan Organizations. Journal for the Study of Religions and Ideologies, vol. 10, issue 30, Winter 2011: 127-158.

External links
 Societatea Gebeleizis ("Gebeleizis Association")
 Spiritualitate Daco-Românească ("Daco-Romanian Spirituality")
 Octavian Sarbatoare. The Foundations of Zamolxiana New Religious Movement, 2014. 

Modern paganism in Europe
Religion in Romania